Djamel Bakar (born 6 April 1989) is a Comorian professional footballer who most recently played for the F91 Dudelange and Comoros national football team as a striker.

Club career
On 6 January 2008, Bakar scored three goals for AS Monaco FC against Stade Brestois 29 in the Coupe de France. A very impressive performance for a player of only 18 years, he was commended for this by the French press, and match commentators. On 31 August 2009, Bakar signed for AS Nancy.

On 31 January 2019, Bakar joined Luxembourg National Division club F91 Dudelange. He left the club at the end of the season.

International career
Bakar was born in France to parents of Comorian descent. He represented France at the 2009 Mediterranean Games. In March 2016, he was called up to the Comoros national football team and made his debut in a historic 1–0 win against Botswana.

International goals
Scores and results list Comoros' goal tally first.

Personal life
His brother Ibor represents Comoros at senior level.

References

External links 
 
 
 
 Djamel Bakar at F91 Dudelange's website
 

1989 births
Living people
Footballers from Marseille
Association football forwards
Citizens of Comoros through descent
Comorian footballers
Comoros international footballers
French footballers
French sportspeople of Comorian descent
France youth international footballers
Competitors at the 2009 Mediterranean Games
Ligue 1 players
Ligue 2 players
AS Monaco FC players
AS Nancy Lorraine players
Montpellier HSC players
R. Charleroi S.C. players
Tours FC players
F91 Dudelange players
Mediterranean Games competitors for France